LZJB is a lossless data compression algorithm invented by Jeff Bonwick to compress crash dumps and data in ZFS. The software is CDDL license licensed. It includes a number of improvements to the LZRW1 algorithm, a member of the Lempel–Ziv family of compression algorithms. The name LZJB is derived from its parent algorithm and its creator—Lempel Ziv Jeff Bonwick. Bonwick is also one of two architects of ZFS, and the creator of the Slab Allocator.

References

External links
 
 
 LZJB python binding
 Javascript port of the LZJB algorithm

Lossless compression algorithms
Sun Microsystems software
Free software
Software using the CDDL license